Angraecum subulatum is a species of comet orchid that can be found in Cameroon, the Democratic Republic of the Congo, Côte d'Ivoire, Equatorial Guinea, Gabon, Ghana, Guinea, Liberia, Nigeria and Sierra Leone. This species is found in lowland forests, especially those rich in Caesalpinioideae between 50 and 700 m elevation. It occurs in periodically inundated swampy forests with Raphia, Pandanus and Marantaceae, and on calcareous rock in shrubby vegetation. It has been recorded on high shaded branches of Gilbertiodendron dewevrei.

References

subulatum